Kovač, meaning "blacksmith" in South Slavic languages, is a common surname in Croatia, Bosnia-Herzegovina, Slovenia and Serbia.

Kovač is a common surname in Croatia, with 9,614 carriers (2011 census), most of them living in northern and eastern parts of the country. The surname is one of the most common surnames in five counties of Croatia. It is common in Serbia, with 8,749 people bearing it. In Slovenia, some 4,800 have this surname. Outside Europe, the surname is fairly common in the United States (especially Texas and California), Canada, and South America.

The surname Kovács is the Hungarian loanword of this word, and is one of the most frequent surnames in Hungary. The Romanian form is Covaci, and it is also a relatively frequent surname in Romania. The derivative forms Kovačić or Slovenian Kovačič, as well as Kovačević and Bulgarian Kovachev, are also very common.

Cognates 
 Koval in Ukraine (also Kovalchuk, Kovalenko, Kovalev)
 Kowal in Poland (also Kowalczyk, Kowalski)
 Kovach, the Carpatho-Ruthenian form
 Kovács, Kováts or Kovách in Hungary
 Kováč in Slovakia
 Kovář (also Kováč) in Czech Republic
 Kovaçi in Albania
 Covaci in Romania

Notable people 

 Aleksandra Kovač (born 1972), Serbian singer/songwriter
 Boris Kovač (born 1955), Serbian composer and multi-instrumentalist
 Edvard Kovač (born 1950), Slovenian theologian
 Jože Kovač (born 1961), Slovenian hockey player
 Kordula Kovac (born 1957), German politician
 Kornelije Kovač (born 1942), Serbian musician/producer
 Kristina Kovač (born 1974), Serbian singer/songwriter
 Marko Kovač (born 1981), Serbian architect, film director and actor
 Mario Kovač (disambiguation), multiple people
 Mirko Kovač (1938–2013), Montenegrin writer
 Mirko Kovač (born 1983), Serbian basketball player
 Mišo Kovač (born 1941), Croatian singer
 Niko Kovač (born 1971), Croatian football player and coach
 Nikola "NiKo" Kovač (born 1997), Bosnian professional CSGO player
 Robert Kovač (born 1974), Croatian football player
 Roberto Kovac (born 1990), Swiss basketball player
 Slobodan Kovač (born 1967), Serbian volleyball player
 Sonja Kovač (born 1984), Croatian actress and model
 Tinkara Kovač (born 1978), Slovenian singer/musician

Fictional characters
 Luka Kovač, doctor portrayed by Goran Višnjić on ER
 Steve Kovac, character cryogenically frozen in Howard Fast's The Cold, Cold Box

See also
 
 Kováčik, surname
 Kovačić, surname
 Kovačina (surname)
 Kovačec, surname
 Kovaček, surname
 Kovačev, surname
 Kovačevik, surname
 Kovačević, surname
 Kovačevski, surname
 Kovács, surname
 List of most common surnames in Europe
 Kovack
 Kovak (disambiguation)

References

Occupational surnames
Serbian surnames
Montenegrin surnames
Bosnian surnames
Croatian surnames
Slovene-language surnames